The Peopletree Sessions is an electronic/folk rock album by Milla Jovovich recorded in 1998 during several late night sessions at producer Emit Bloch's apartment in Los Angeles.

Background

"The Peopletree Sessions" was originally issued on Bloch's People Tree Recordings label, from which it derives its name. Shortly after its original issuance, Jovovich and Turin publicly disagreed about the releases' legitimacy. Jovovich, who was filming The Messenger: The Story of Joan of Arc at the time, attempted to quell the spread of the release over the Internet while Bloch argued for its artistic merit. Legal action was never taken and Cherry Red Records has reissued the remastered CD version of the sessions. There are two versions released of the album. The first, being the standard version, with a black cover art, which includes sixteen tracks and one untitled hidden track. The second version, labeled as the UK Edition, with a complete different orange cover art, features the same track list, but also includes the tracks "Hi, It's Milla", "Loose Weight" and "Queen of the Parade" and does not include the remix of "House of Spiders". In 2000, The Peopletree Sessions was chosen as the 'Pop CD of the Week' and given 3/5 stars by The Guardian, which called it "so barking, it's great". The album also received a positive review from All Music Guide.

Track listing

Standard edition
"Queen Electric" (Milica Jovović, David Turin, Chris Brenner, Danny Elder) – 3:37
"Flu with Adam" (Jovović, Turin, Brenner) – 3:50
"Sweetheart" (Jovović, Turin, Brenner, Elder) – 4:17
"DJ Puppy Ink" (Jovović, Elder) – 2:28
"I Tell" (Jovović, Turin, Brenner, Elder) – 3:19
"Going Down" (Jovović, Turin, Brenner, Elder) – 3:02
"Flu Acoustic" (Jovović, Turin, Brenner) – 6:18
"Purge" (Jovović, Turin, Brenner, Elder) – 3:22
"House of Spiders" (Jovović, Turin, Brenner) – 7:03
"Secret Society" (Jovović, Turin, Brenner, Elder) – 3:09
"Flu @ Sinc" (Jovović, Turin, Brenner) – 2:44
"Separate Worlds" (Jovović, Turin, Brenner) – 2:45
"Separate Worlds" (Remix) (Jovović, Turin, Brenner) – 3:08
"Wake Baby" (Jovović, Turin, Brenner) – 3:55
"Saturday" (Jovović, Turin, Brenner) – 2:47
"House of Spiders" (Remix) (Jovović, Turin, Brenner) – 1:35
"Untitled" (Jovović, Turin, Brenner) – 4:02

UK edition
"Hi, It's Milla"
"Queen Electric" (Jovović, Turin, Brenner, Elder) – 3:37
"Flu with Adam" (Jovović, Turin, Brenner) – 3:50
"Sweetheart" (Jovović, Turin, Brenner, Elder) – 4:17
"DJ Puppy Ink" (Jovović, Elder) – 2:28
"I Tell" (Jovović, Turin, Brenner, Elder) – 3:19
"Going Down" (Jovović, Turin, Brenner, Elder) – 3:02
"Flu Acoustic" (Jovović, Turin, Brenner) – 6:18
"Purge" (Jovović, Turin, Brenner, Elder) – 3:22
"Secret Society" (Jovović, Turin, Brenner, Elder) – 3:09
"Flu @ Sinc" (Jovović, Turin, Brenner) – 2:44
"Separate Worlds" (Jovović, Turin, Brenner) – 2:45
"Separate Worlds" (Remix) (Jovović, Turin, Brenner) – 3:08
"Wake Baby" (Jovović, Turin, Brenner) – 3:55
"Saturday" (Jovović, Turin, Brenner) – 2:47
"House of Spiders" (Jovović, Turin, Brenner) – 7:03
"Loose Weight"
"Queen of the Parade" (Remix)

"Queen Electric" and "Saturday" share the same background music.
"Flu Acoustic" is an acoustic version of "Flu with Adam".
"Flu @ Sinc" is another version of "Flu with Adam".
"Queen of the Parade" (Remix) is another version of "Queen Electric".

Personnel
Milla Jovovich – main vocals and guitar, producer
Chris Brenner – keyboard, mandolin
Emit Bloch – acoustic guitar, keyboard, producer
Danny Elder – programming, producer

References

1998 albums
Milla Jovovich albums
SBK Records albums
Capitol Records albums
EMI Records albums